Benjamin David Wilson (born 26 June 1975) is a retired Australian football referee. He is also an accountant. Wilson was a referee at the 2011 AFC Asian Cup.

Career
Wilson has refereed internationally at the OFC Nations Cup, the 2005 FIFA World Youth Championship, the 2006 FIFA World Cup, and the 2007 FIFA Club World Cup. He has also been a referee in the Australia A-League since the 2005-06 season.

References

External links
 AFC Profile
 
  (archive)
 

1975 births
Australian soccer referees
Living people